Rosario Maddaloni (born 2 August 1988) is an Italian badminton player.

Achievements

BWF International Challenge/Series (7 titles, 11 runners-up) 
Men's singles

Men's doubles

  BWF International Challenge tournament
  BWF International Series tournament
  BWF Future Series tournament

References

External links 
 

1988 births
Living people
People from Torre del Greco
Sportspeople from the Province of Naples
Italian male badminton players
Badminton players at the 2015 European Games
Badminton players at the 2019 European Games
European Games competitors for Italy
Competitors at the 2013 Mediterranean Games
Competitors at the 2018 Mediterranean Games
Mediterranean Games competitors for Italy